The Grillagh River is a small river located outside Maghera, County Londonderry, Northern Ireland. It starts in Slaughtneil a rural area northwest of Maghera southwest of Swatragh south of Glenullin and north of Glen. Slaughtneil means Nialls Gravestone and Grillagh River Means The Muddy River. Four Arterys Meaning Headstreams start the main river.

The Altkeeran Burn at the foot of Carntogher Mountain is the origins of the Grillagh River meaning Glen of the rowan trees burn this is the main artery and the largest of the mountain burns .which is where most late Autumn Salmon Return to spawn the burn starts on the west side of Carntogher and flows eastward merging with the Carn Burn then flows on passing under Altkeeran Bridge then merging with the Pollan Water Burn [Tullykeeran Burn] and finally the Backparks Burn before formally forming the Grillagh River upstream from Slaughtneil Bridge.

The Carn Burn is another stream meaning Carntogher Burn which starts in the centre of the Carntogher Basin it flows under Cairn Last Bridge then onwards expanding rapidly then flows under the Carn Bridge. Shortly downstream it merges with the Altkeeran.

The Backparks Burn is another artery of the Grillagh River meaning green burn it starts on the east side of Carntogher and flows for a few miles flowing under Backparks Bridge then expanding quickly from a small stream to quite a large mountain burn about the size of the Pollan Water. It also holds a stock of brown trout and salmon which travel upriver for spawning.

The Pollan Water is one of the headwater Tributarys that feed the main Grillagh. It starts near Shefin meaning seat of Finn and flows a few miles before merging with the Altkeeran Burn downstream from the Tullykeeran Bridge.

The name means a wet and mucky area and its also known to locals as Pixies Paradise. It is sourced up on Carntogher Mountain, one of the major peaks of the Sperrins and flows into the Clady. It is regarded as a good fishing river by locals of Maghera, Swatragh and the Clady And District Angling Club. It also flows through the nature reserve of Drumnaph Woods, making it a major checkpoint in the forest reserve. It is known as the "salmon's kingdom in the forest" because of the many fish species — including salmon, Rainbow Trout, Brown Trout, Dollaghan on occasion , and other smaller fish that is caught from time to time the tend to hide in the rocks or deep under the water the best method on this river for those who are anglers is spin fishing with mepps or Z or even toby lures — these fish migrate upriver to spawn and lay eggs. Often dippers are spotted around the old bridges, where they dive to the bottom in order to feed on a range of aquatic invertebrates. The river itself is a spate river during the winter; it is fast flowing with white rapids. In the summer, the river is a lot lazier, and collects a lot of green algae, especially around culnady downwards making it difficult for deeper fishing at these times. The river itself is about 5 to 7 metres in the upper reaches and about 10 metres on its lower course. The Grillagh merges with the Knockoneil River to form the Clady River.

The River is leases by the Clady And District Angling Club funded in 1962.

Bridges 

There are 7 bridge that cross the Grillagh which include 

The 
Slaughtneil Bridge, Gortinure Bridge, Drumnaph Bridge, Grillagh Bridge, 

Beresford Bridge, Drumbolg Culnady Bridge, Curdian Bridge

The Roohan Burn One of the major tributary streams which starts on Tullykeeran Mountain flows through Tirkane Behind The St Brigids Primary is one of the major brown trout spawning streams on the upper river and small trout can sometimes be seen catching flies at the foot of which is locally known as the School Bridge at the foot of Tirkane settlement.

The Curragh Burn Another tributary below culnady also acts as a brown trout spawning Sheugh.

References

 http://www.ecocontainerhome.com/2015/06/grillagh-water-container-house
 https://www.archdaily.com/593806/grillagh-water-house-patrick-bradley-architects
 http://www.drumnaph.org/en/walking-trails/ruachan-trail/the-salmons-kingdom 

Rivers of County Londonderry